Guadalupe Fernández Lacort (born 1st August 1996) is an Argentinian field hockey player.

Hockey career 
She was the part of the Argentine team that won the 2016 Women's Hockey Junior World Cup after a beating the Netherlands in the finals.

In 2020, Fernández was called into the senior national women's team.

References

1996 births
Living people
Las Leonas players
Argentine female field hockey players
Female field hockey defenders
Field hockey players from Buenos Aires